William Strother Thomas (1881–1963) was a Welsh professional rugby league footballer who played in the 1900s, 1910s and 1920s.

Playing career

International honours
Willie Thomas won a cap for Wales while at Salford in 1911.

Championship final appearances
During Willie Thomas' time there was Salford's 5–3 victory over Huddersfield in the Championship Final during the 1913–14 season.

Challenge Cup Final appearances
Willie Thomas  played right-, i.e. number 3, in Salford's 0-5 defeat by Bradford F.C. in the 1906 Challenge Cup Final during the 1905–06 season at Headingley Rugby Stadium, Leeds on Saturday 28 April 1906.

References

Oldham R.L.F.C. players
Place of birth missing
Place of death missing
Rugby league centres
Salford Red Devils players
Wales national rugby league team players
Welsh rugby league players
1880s births
Year of birth uncertain
Year of death missing